Velledopsis is a genus of longhorn beetles of the subfamily Lamiinae, containing the following species:

 Velledopsis kenyensis Breuning, 1936
 Velledopsis tanganycae Breuning, 1969

References

Phrissomini